Percy Isenia (born 25 December 1976 in Zwijndrecht) is a Dutch former baseball player who played for SV ADO and the Dutch national team.

Isenia batted .304/.385/.478 in the 1999 World Port Tournament to help the Netherlands to the title. He was 3 for 9 with a double, triple and 5 walks in the 1999 European Championship, also won by the Dutch. In the 1999 Intercontinental Cup, he hit .320/.370/.360 as the best Dutch hitter in a disappointing tournament for the team. eIn 2000, the 23-year-old Neptunus player tied for 4th in Hoofdklasse with 35 runs, tied for 8th with 3 home runs and tied for fifth with 29 RBI. He had as many RBI as long-time Dutch star Marcel Joost and one ahead of two other Dutch legends, Rikkert Faneyte and Dirk van 't Klooster. In the 2000 Haarlem Baseball Week, Isenia was 4 for 15 with a double, two walks, two RBI and a run.

He then hit .250/.280/.333 as the Dutch first baseman in the 2000 Summer Olympics in Sydney in which the Netherlands finished fifth. In 2001, Isenia helped the Netherlands win the European Championship, batting fifth and playing first base in the gold medal game. His 39 RBI for Neptunus in 2001 were second in Hoofdklasse to Michael Crouwel. He helped Neptunus to the title. In the 2001 World Port Tournament, he hit .231/.302/.436 with a couple home runs for the silver medalists.

In the 2001 Baseball World Cup, Isenia batted .250/.308/.417, playing all 10 games at first for the Orange. In the 2001 European Championship, he batted .250/.324/.375 but led the Gold Medal winners with 9 RBI. In the 2002 Intercontinental Cup, Isenia produced at a .182/.308/.455 clip; he hit one of only two homers for the Netherlands, with Hensley Meulens providing the other. In the Dutch league that year, Isenia was a top star. He hit .340 (4th in Hoofdklasse), had 67 hits (second to van 't Klooster), scored 29 runs (10th), smacked 16 doubles (leading the league, one ahead of Reily Legito), hit 3 homers (tied for 8th) and drove in 43 (second-best, one behind leader Sidney de Jong. During 2002 Haarlem Baseball Week, he went 2 for 16 with a walk, run and a RBI.

Neptunus won another title in 2003 thanks to Isenia. He tied Norbert Lokhorst for the lead with 11 doubles and his 4 homers were one behind leader Evert-Jan 't Hoen. He tied van 't Klooster for 5th in RBI (26). In the 2003 Baseball World Cup, Isenia played DH so that Sharnol Adriana could be used at first. Isenia batted .333/.360/.583 with five RBI in six games. During the 2003 European Championship, Isenia was 3 for 6 in two games for the champion Dutch entry. In the 2003 World Port Tournament, Percy hit .243/~.282/.378 with 7 RBI to tie Fausto Álvarez for third in the event. He hit one of the two homers in the WPT that year; Tjerk Smeets had the other.

In 2004, the 27-year-old did not finish among the Hoofdklasse leaders in anything for the first time in five years. Isenia did not make the Dutch team for the 2004 Summer Olympics as Yurendell de Caster was chosen at first base instead with de Jong as the backup. During 2004 Haarlem Baseball Week, Isenia went 2 for 11 with a double, walk, run and 3 RBI. Isenia hit .271/.347/.349 for Neptunus in 2005 as they won their sixth straight title. In the 2005 Baseball World Cup, he batted .289/.400/.632 to help the Dutch finish 4th, their best finish to that point. He had 7 doubles, 11 runs and 8 RBI in 10 games. He made the All-Tournament team at first base. Isenia also did well in the 2005 European Championship, tying Ivanon Coffie for third in hits (14), finishing 4th in slugging (.710) and tying for third in RBI (10); Jairo Ramos Gizzi beat him out for All-Star honors at first base.

In the 2006 World Baseball Classic, Isenia struck out against J.C. Romero as a pinch-hitter for Adriana in the 8th inning of game one. In game three, he was 2 for 4 with a walk as the #5 hitter and DH in a rout of Panama. Overall, his .400/.500/.400 line produced a better OPS than the team's other 1B/DH options, major leaguer Randall Simon and AAA veteran Adriana. Isenia hit .273/.385/.273 in the 2006 Haarlem Baseball Week and scored the tying run in the finale against Cuba. In 2006, he moved to SV ADO and produced at a .240/.308/.331 clip, a shadow of his former self. He tied Harvey Monte for fifth in doubles. He hit .226/.294/.516 with 7 runs and 8 RBI in 8 games in the 2006 Intercontinental Cup to help the Dutch to a silver medal. Isenia batted .282/.331/.444 in 2007. He was 4 for 19 with a double in the 2007 World Port Tournament.

Isenia was selected by coach Robert Eenhoorn in the team that represents the Netherlands at the 2008 Summer Olympics in Beijing.

References

External links
Isenia's profile at honkbalsite.com 

Dutch baseball players
Olympic baseball players of the Netherlands
Baseball players at the 2000 Summer Olympics
Baseball players at the 2008 Summer Olympics
Sportspeople from Zwijndrecht, Netherlands
1976 births
Living people